α-Naphthyl butyrate esterase, also referred to as naphthyl butyrate esterase or butyrate esterase, is a histological stain specific for white blood cells of the monocytic proliferation line.

It is used in the diagnosis of leukemia when staining touch preparation type slides of bone marrow.  It is instrumental in the diagnosis of monocytic leukemias and the myelomonocytic variant of acute myelocytic leukemia.

References

Hematology